Judyta Jakubowiczowa also called Zarówkaer and Sonnenberg (1751-1829) was a Polish-Jewish merchant and banker.

Judyta Jakubowiczowa married in 1770 to the rich Jewish merchant-banker Samuel Zbytkower, purveyor to the Polish king. She served as negotiator for her famously wealthy spouse. After his death in 1801, she continued his business alone. During the period of the Duchy of Warsaw, she was the largest purveyor to the Polish and French armies.

References

1751 births
1829 deaths
18th-century Polish–Lithuanian businesspeople
19th-century Polish businesspeople
Polish bankers
Polish women in business
19th-century businesswomen
People of the Duchy of Warsaw
18th-century Polish Jews

19th-century Polish Jews
Jewish philanthropists
Polish philanthropists
Businesspeople from Warsaw